Montgomery County is a county in the U.S. state of Tennessee. As of the 2020 United States census, the population was 220,069. The county seat (and only incorporated municipality) is Clarksville. The county was created in 1796. Montgomery County is included in the Clarksville, TN–KY Metropolitan Statistical Area.

History
The county was named for John Montgomery, a soldier in the American Revolutionary War and an early settler who founded the city of Clarksville. It was authorized on 9 April 1796, when the western portion of Tennessee County, which since 1790 had been part of the Territory South of the River Ohio, became part of the new state of Tennessee. (In 1790, North Carolina had ceded its western lands to the Federal government to create what was also known as the Southwest Territory.) The eastern portion of old Tennessee County was, at the same time Montgomery County was formed, combined with land taken from Sumner County to form Robertson County, Tennessee. Later acts of the Tennessee General Assembly had further reduced Montgomery County by 1871 to its current size and boundaries.

Montgomery County was the site of several early saltpeter mines. Saltpeter is the main ingredient of gunpowder and was obtained by leaching the earth from local caves. Bellamy Cave near Stringtown still contains the remains of two dozen saltpeter leaching vats. It appears to have been a large operation. Cooper Creek Cave shows evidence of extensive mining and contains the remains of "many saltpeter hoppers". Both were probably mined during the War of 1812. Dunbar Cave is reported to have been mined for saltpeter during the Mexican War of 1848, but commercial development has destroyed any evidence of this. Little mining is likely to have happened here during the Civil War, since the Union Army captured and occupied this part of Tennessee in early 1862.

Geography
Montgomery County lies on the north line of Tennessee; its north border abuts the state of Kentucky. The hilly terrain is marked by drainages and largely covered with trees. The Cumberland River meanders westward through the lower central part of the county. The highest point on the county terrain ( ASL) is a small hill  ENE from Slayden in Dickson County.

Dunbar Cave
Montgomery County lies in a region of well-developed karst topography. A large cave system under the county is named Dunbar Cave; it is the centerpiece of Dunbar Cave State Park, which encompasses approximately 110 acres and is one of the most visited units in the Tennessee State Park System.

Dunbar Cave was extensively used by prehistoric Indians, who inhabited this area for thousands of years before European encounter. Remains of their cane torches have been found in the cave, and archaeologists have excavated numerous artifacts inside the entrance.  During a research trip into the cave on January 15, 2005, Park Ranger Amy Wallace, History professor Joe Douglas, local historian Billyfrank Morrison, and Geologist Larry E. Matthews, discovered Indian glyphs on the walls of the cave. Subsequent investigations by archaeologists from the University of Tennessee at Knoxville confirmed the drawings were from people of the Mississippian culture, which was active about 1000-1300 CE. These glyphs were featured for a few years on the tour of the cave.

In 2010, the State of Tennessee closed Dunbar Cave to the public because White Nose Syndrome was diagnosed in a bat and they did not want the disease to spread. The cave has since reopened and tours are conducted seasonally, from May to August (with special hygiene procedures in place).

Adjacent counties

 Christian County, Kentucky - northwest
 Todd County, Kentucky - northeast
 Robertson County - east
 Cheatham County - southeast
 Dickson County - south
 Houston County - southwest
 Stewart County - west

Protected areas

 Barnett's Woods State Natural Area
 Dunbar Cave State Natural Area
 Dunbar Cave State Park
 Haynes Bottom Wildlife Management Area
 Port Royal State Park (part)
 Shelton Ferry Wildlife Management Area

Demographics

2020 census

As of the 2020 United States census, there were 220,069 people, 76,974 households, and 53,563 families residing in the county.

2000 census
As of the 2000 United States Census, there were 134,768 people, 48,330 households, and 35,957 families in the county. The racial makeup of the county was 73.17% White, 19.18% Black or African American, 0.53% Native American, 1.82% Asian, 0.21% Pacific Islander, 2.18% from other races, and 2.91% from two or more races. 5.16% of the population were Hispanic or Latino of any race.

There were 48,330 households, out of which 40.70% had children under the age of 18 living with them, 58.70% were married couples living together, 12.20% had a female householder with no husband present, and 25.60% were non-families. 20.20% of all households were made up of individuals, and 5.50% had someone living alone who was 65 years of age or older. The average household size was 2.70 and the average family size was 3.11.

The county population contained 28.40% under the age of 18, 12.30% from 18 to 24, 34.30% from 25 to 44, 17.20% from 45 to 64, and 7.80% who were 65 years of age or older. The median age was 30 years. For every 100 females, there were 101.20 males. For every 100 females age 18 and over, there were 98.80 males.

The median income for a household in the county was $38,981, and the median income for a family was $43,023. Males had a median income of $30,696 versus $22,581 for females. The per capita income for the county was $17,265. About 7.90% of families and 10.00% of the population were below the poverty line, including 12.70% of those under age 18 and 10.70% of those age 65 or over.

Government

The County Commission has 21 members, each elected from a single-member district. In addition, voters elect a County Mayor at-large and certain other county-level positions, including the sheriff.

Communities

City
 Clarksville (county seat)

Unincorporated communities

 Cunningham
 Needmore
 New Providence
 Oakridge
 Palmyra
 Port Royal
 Salem
 Sango
 Shady Grove
 South Guthrie
 Southaven
 Southside
 St. Bethlehem
 Woodlawn

Education
Clarksville-Montgomery County School System serves most of the county. Portions in Fort Campbell however are zoned to Department of Defense Education Activity (DoDEA) schools. Fort Campbell High School is the zoned high school for Fort Campbell.

See also
 National Register of Historic Places listings in Montgomery County, Tennessee

References

External links

 
 Montgomery County, TNGenWeb - free genealogy resources for the county
 

 
1796 establishments in Tennessee
Populated places established in 1796
Clarksville metropolitan area
Middle Tennessee